Curtis Lee Deloatch (born October 4, 1981) is a former American football cornerback who played in the National Football League (NFL). He was signed by the New York Giants as an undrafted free agent in 2004.  He played college football at North Carolina A&T.

Deloatch has also played for the New Orleans Saints, Carolina Panthers and Florida Tuskers.

Early years
Deloatch played high school football at Hertford County High School in Ahoskie, North Carolina.

College career
Deloatch attended North Carolina Agricultural and Technical State University.  As a redshirt freshman, he played in the team's final eight games as a reserve free safety.  He recorded seven tackles (four solo) with nine pass deflections and an interception.  He also returned 12 punts for 143 yards (11.9-yard avg.) and five kickoffs for 104 yards (20.8-yard avg.)

As a sophomore in 2001, Deloatch was a consensus All-American and first-team All-Mid-Eastern Athletic Conference choice.  He lined up at free safety and recorded 26 tackles (18 solo) with a stop for a 3-yard loss.  Deloatch set school and conference season-records, as he gained 248 yards with a pair of touchdowns on four interceptions.  He deflected six passes and returned eight kickoffs for 392 yards (34.0 avg).  He set NCAA Division I-AA season-records as he scored five times on 20 punts for a school season-record 530 yards, leading the nation with a 26.5-yard average.

As a junior, Deloatch appeared in ten games at strong-side cornerback, recording 14 tackles (ten solo) with an assisted stop for a 3-yard loss.  He intercepted a pass, deflected six others and returned 28 punts for 193 yards (6.9 avg).

As a senior, Deloatch was an All-MEAC second-team selection as a defensive back.  He played in every game and had 21 tackles (15 solo) with an assisted stop for a 3-yard loss.  He intercepted four passes for 44 yards and a touchdown.  He deflected eight passes and blocked a kick.  Deloatch also returned 28 punts for 269 yards (9.6-yard avg.) and three kickoffs for 38 yards.

Professional career

New York Giants
Deloatch played for the New York Giants in 2004 and 2005, having been acquired as an undrafted free agent.

In 2004, he was one of only two members of the Giants 2004 rookie class to play in all 16 regular season games (the other was linebacker Reggie Torbor.)  The majority of action came on special teams and in nickel and dime packages.  He finished with 17 tackles (15 solo) and 12 special teams tackles.

The following year, he played in all 16 regular season games with 13 starts at right cornerback, plus the NFC Wild Card Game.  Finished the season with 54 tackles (45 solo), one interception, a team-high 12 passes defensed, one fumble recovery and four special teams tackles.

He was waived by the Giants before the 2006 regular season.

New Orleans Saints
Deloatch was then claimed by the Saints on September 3, 2006.

Less than three weeks later, he scored one of the most dramatic touchdowns in Saints history, when he recovered a Michael Koenen punt blocked by Steve Gleason against the Atlanta Falcons. Deloatch was a late substitution on the play, told to run onto the field at the last second when Saints special teams coordinator John Bonamego noticed that only 10 men were on the field. He had no preparation for the play, was told to "just go rush the kick." It was the first touchdown in the Saints' first home game in nearly 21 months, since Hurricane Katrina devastated the city.

Carolina Panthers
In 2007, Deloatch signed with the Carolina Panthers but tore his ACL in October against the Colts ending his season.  He was placed on injured reserve by the Carolina Panthers on October 31, 2007.

On May 27, 2008, Deloatch was re-signed by the Panthers.  He was later released after the Panthers had to cut down their roster size.

Florida Tuskers
Deloatch was signed by the Florida Tuskers of the United Football League on August 25, 2009. He was released on September 22, 2009.

References

1981 births
Living people
Players of American football from North Carolina
American football cornerbacks
American football safeties
North Carolina A&T Aggies football players
New York Giants players
New Orleans Saints players
Carolina Panthers players
Florida Tuskers players